This page shows the results of the Diving Competition for men and women at the 1967 Pan American Games, held from July 23 to August 6, 1967 in Winnipeg, Manitoba, Canada. There were two events, for both men and women.

Men's competition

3m Springboard

10m Platform

Women's competition

3m Springboard

10m Platform

Medal table

See also
 Diving at the 1968 Summer Olympics

References
 Sports 123

1967
1967 Pan American Games
1967 in diving